Ordos Ejin Horo International Airport  is an airport serving Ordos City in China's Inner Mongolia Autonomous Region.  It is located in Ejin Horo Banner. First built in 1959 and called Dongsheng Airport, the airport ceased operation in 1983. In 2005 the airport was rebuilt at the current site with an investment of 350 million yuan, and re-opened in July 2007.

Facilities
Ordos Airport has a runway that is 3,200 meters long and 60 meters wide (class 4E).  It is designed to handle 270,000 passengers per year.

The airport has two terminals: a main international terminal building with 11 jet bridges and a VIP Lounge. It also has a smaller domestic terminal nearby with two jet bridges. 

The terminal buildings were completed in 2012 by an architectural group consisting of China Architecture Design & Research Group, Zhongxu Planning and Architecture Design Company, Limited, B+H Architects.

Airlines and destinations

Transportation
Access to the airport is mainly by car with a large parking area and connected by G65 Highway and Airport Highway (toll).

See also
List of airports in China
List of the busiest airports in China

References

Airports in Inner Mongolia
Airports established in 1959
Airports disestablished in 1983
Airports established in 2007
1959 establishments in China
1983 disestablishments in China
2007 establishments in China
Buildings and structures in Ordos City